Christophe Philippe Charles (born 1951) is a Haitian poet. Born in Port-au-Prince, Charles received a philosophy degree from the University of Haiti. One of his best-known poems is Désastre (1975).

References
 

1951 births
Living people
Haitian male poets
People from Port-au-Prince
20th-century Haitian poets
20th-century male writers
Date of birth missing (living people)